is a Japanese triathlete. He was a competitor for Japan at the 2012 Summer Olympics where Hosoda finished 43rd overall with a total time of 1:51:40.

Hosoda won the gold medal in Triathlon at the 2010 Asian Games in a time of 1:52:15.56. He is the winner of the 2014 ITU Aquathlon World Championship.

References

Japanese male triathletes
Triathletes at the 2012 Summer Olympics
Olympic triathletes of Japan
1984 births
Living people
Asian Games medalists in triathlon
Triathletes at the 2010 Asian Games
Triathletes at the 2014 Asian Games
Triathletes at the 2018 Asian Games
Asian Games gold medalists for Japan
Medalists at the 2010 Asian Games
Medalists at the 2014 Asian Games
Medalists at the 2018 Asian Games
20th-century Japanese people
21st-century Japanese people